Aethes afghana is a moth of the  family Tortricidae. It was first described from Afghanistan where it is probably widely distributed. It is known from the vicinity of Kabul, Safed Koh and Paghman Mountains. Specimens were collected at altitudes of 2,200 to 2,650 meters. It has also been recorded from Kashmir.

References

External links

 Tortricidae (Lepidoptera) from Kashmir and Ladakh

Moths described in 1983
afghana
Taxa named by Józef Razowski
Moths of Asia